Oscar Ingemar Kristoffer Vilhelmsson (born 2 October 2003) is a Swedish professional footballer who plays for German  club Darmstadt 98 as a forward.

Club career
On 12 July 2022, Vilhelmsson signed a four-year contract with Darmstadt 98 in Germany.

References

External links 
 

2003 births
Living people
People from Kungsbacka Municipality
Sportspeople from Halland County
Swedish footballers
Association football forwards
Sweden youth international footballers
Allsvenskan players
IFK Göteborg players
SV Darmstadt 98 players
Swedish expatriate footballers
Expatriate footballers in Germany
Swedish expatriate sportspeople in Germany